Philippe of Lorraine (1643 – 8 December 1702), known as the Chevalier de Lorraine, was a French nobleman and member of the House of Guise, cadet of the Ducal House of Lorraine. He was the renowned lover of Philippe I, Duke of Orléans, brother of Louis XIV.

Biography

Philippe was the second son of the Count and Countess of Harcourt. His father, Henri of Lorraine, was created the Count of Harcourt in 1605, aged 4. Henri was also the Grand Squire of France, a prestigious charge of the royal stables, the transport of the king, and his ceremonial entourage. He was known as Monsieur le Grand. His mother, Marguerite-Philippe du Cambout, was a member of the old House of Cambout, who traced their ancestry back to the Sovereign Dukes of Brittany (11th century–1547).

His oldest brother, Louis, was Count of Armagnac and husband of Catherine de Neufville, the youngest daughter of Nicolas de Neufville de Villeroy, governor of a young Louis XIV. She was a sister of François de Neufville de Villeroy, the future governor of Louis XV.

Philippe was the titular Abbot of four abbeys: Saint-Père-en-Vallée in the Diocese of Chartres, Tiron, Saint-Benoît-sur-Loire. and Saint-Jean-des-Vignes de Soissons.
Known to be "as beautiful as an angel", Philippe became the duc d’Orléans' lover in 1658, while living at the duke's Palais-Royal residence in Paris, where the young Princess Henriette Anne of England was living with her mother Queen Henriette Marie. The two Henriettes had fled England due to the English Civil War and had lived at the Palais-Royal as a grace and favour residence.

Lorraine and Henriette would later live together under closer circumstances; the duc d’Orléans married Henriette Anne at the Palais-Royal in 1661. The duke openly flaunted his affairs at court, especially the one with his long term lover Lorraine, who maintained a rocky relationship with Henriette. 

The duc d’Orléans even told Henriette Anne that he could not love her without Lorraine's permission, and thus his first marriage was not a happy one. In January 1670, his wife prevailed upon the King to imprison the chevalier, first near Lyon, then in the Mediterranean island-fortress of the Château d'If, and finally he was banished to Rome. But by February, a month later, Monsieur's protests and pleas persuaded the King to restore him to his brother's entourage.

When in 1670 Henriette Anne died suddenly and mysteriously at Saint-Cloud it was suspected that Lorraine had poisoned her, even though the autopsy performed reported that Henrietta-Anne had died of peritonitis caused by a perforated ulcer. The duc d’Orléans married Elizabeth Charlotte of the Palatinate in 1671, who later wrote of Lorraine:

{{quote|text=Philippe de Lorraine was three years younger than Philippe d'Orléans. Insinuating, brutal and devoid of scruple, he was the great love of Monsieur'''s life. He was also the worst enemy of the latter's two wives. As greedy as a vulture, this younger son of the French branch of the House of Lorraine had, by the end of the 1650s, hooked Monsieur like a harpooned whale. The young prince loved him with a passion that worried Madame Henrietta and the court bishop, Cosnac, but it was plain to the King that, thanks to the attractive face and sharp mind of the good-looking chevalier, he would have his way with his brother.}}

In 1682, Lorraine was exiled again, having been accused of seducing the young Count of Vermandois (son of Louis XIV and Louise de La Vallière) with his set (including the Prince of Conti) and began practicing le vice italien (the contemporary term for homosexuality).

Having been allowed to return to court, he was then blamed for helping to instigate the marriage between the duc de Chartres and Mademoiselle de Blois in 1692. Chartres was the son of Lorraine's lover, the duc d’Orléans and his second wife Elizabeth Charlotte of the Palatinate, who did not get on with Lorraine at all and merely "tolerated his existence." According to Henriette Anne, Elizabeth Charlotte, and Saint-Simon, Lorraine frequently manipulated the duc d’Orléans.  

At the end of his life, by 1701, Philippe de Lorraine had lost much of the furniture in his apartment at the Palais-Royal and in his country residence (filled with remains from the Palatinate), his four abbeys, and all the money he had obtained (more or less with permission) from the coffers of the State, by gambling and exploitation of his lovers; however, he did manage to reconcile with Elizabeth Charlotte.

Saint-Simon also said that Lorraine married in secret his cousin Béatrice Hiéronyme de Lorraine (1662–1738), Abbess of Remiremont.

Death
Lorraine died in 1702, aged roughly 59, from a fit of apoplexy, having lain with women the night before.

Relatives
His niece, Marie de Lorraine, was the Princess of Monaco, as the wife of Antonio I.

Lorraine has descendants, including the old Counts of Oeynhausen, Marquess of Alorna and a line of the Counts of Stolberg-Wernigerode.

Portrayals in media
Philippe has been portrayed by a few actors over the years:

 Versailles (2015 TV series), played by Evan Williams

Issue
 Alexandre, Chevalier de Beauvernois (? – after 1734), nicknamed the bâtard'' of Lorraine. Illegitimate son with Claude de Souches.

Ancestry

References and notes

1643 births
1702 deaths
17th-century French LGBT people
18th-century French LGBT people
French knights
Philippe
Philippe
LGBT Roman Catholics
LGBT nobility
Philippe